Algestone, also known as alphasone or alfasone, as well as dihydroxyprogesterone, is a progestin which was never marketed. Another progestin, algestone acetophenide, in contrast, has been marketed as a hormonal contraceptive.

Chemistry

Algestone, also known as 16α,17α-dihydroxyprogesterone or as 16α,17α-dihydroxypregn-4-ene-3,20-dione, is a synthetic pregnane steroid and a derivative of progesterone and 17α-hydroxyprogesterone. Closely related analogues of algestone include 16α-hydroxyprogesterone, algestone acetonide, and algestone acetophenide.

References

Abandoned drugs
Diketones
Diols
Pregnanes
Progestogens